Moreno may refer to:

Places

Argentina
Moreno (Buenos Aires Metro), a station on Line C of the Buenos Aires Metro
Moreno, Buenos Aires, a city in Buenos Aires Province, Argentina
Moreno Department, a depatnent of Santiago del Estero Province, Argentina
Moreno Partido, a division of the Buenos Aires Province, Argentina

Elsewhere
Moreno, California (disambiguation)
Moreno, Pernambuco, Brazil, a city
Moreno Rock, a rock in Antarctica
Point Moreno, a promontory on Laurie Island in the South Orkney Islands

People with the name

Lists of people with the name
Moreno (given name)
Moreno (surname)

People with the nickname or professional name
Moreno (footballer, born 1948), Daniel Euclides Moreno, Brazilian football forward
Moreno (Portuguese footballer) (born 1981), Portuguese football defensive midfielder
Moreno (footballerc, born 1983), Moreno Aoas Vidal, Brazilian football leftback
Moreno (Spanish footballer) (born 1986), Spanish football defender
Moreno (singer) (born 1989), Italian rap singer

Other uses
Moreno (spider), a spider genus in the family Prodidomidae
ARA Moreno, an early 20th century battleship of the Argentine Navy
Department of Agriculture v. Moreno, a United States Supreme Court case
Imogen Moreno, a fictional character in the Canadian drama Degrassi
Pardo-Venezuelans or Morenos, Venezuelan people who have a mixture of African, Amerindian, and European ancestry
Jose Moreno, a character in the 1930 Broadway stage play Dishonored Lady
Jack Moreno, a character in the 1937 film Man of the People

See also 
 Morena (disambiguation) 
 Morenu
 Perito Moreno (disambiguation)